Obholzer is a surname. Notable people with the surname include: 

Anton Obholzer (born 1968), British rower
Rupert Obholzer (born 1970), British rower